The Guangzhou–Kowloon through train is an inter-city railway service between Hong Kong and Guangzhou jointly operated by the MTR Corporation of Hong Kong and the Guangzhou Railway Group of mainland China. Services operate along the East Rail line within Hong Kong territory, crossing the Hong Kong–Chinese border at Lo Wu, and continuing along the Guangmao Railway and Guangshen Railway in Guangdong province.

Until the suspension of service in early 2020 amidst the coronavirus pandemic twelve trains ran in each direction every day, with a journey time of 1 hour 40 minutes.

The MTRC operates the KTT service on this route. The KTT service is provided by double-decker trains, usually comprising two Premium Class carriages and five First Class carriages. China Railway Guangzhou Group provides the other trains on this route.

Places served by the MTR Guangzhou–Kowloon Through Train include: Hong Kong, Dongguan, Guangzhou.

History

Early years 

The original line of the Chinese section was called Kowloon-Canton Railway Corporation (KCR) and the British section was called Kowloon–Canton Railway (KCR), which later stretched a rapid transit network in the other New Territories regions in Hong Kong. The engineering partnership Messrs Arthur John Barry and John Wolfe-Barry were Consulting Engineers to the project.

The segment within Hong Kong, then a British Crown colony, was known as the British section. Construction began in 1906, and it was opened on 1 October 1910  as a single-track system, roughly corresponding to the present-day East Rail line).

The complete railway between Kowloon in Hong Kong and the Chinese city of Canton (Guangzhou) was opened on 5 October 1911. With the Chinese section opened in 1911, through-trains ran from the southern terminus in Tsim Sha Tsui across the border to the southern Chinese city of Canton. Trains were steam-hauled. From the one-line railroad, the KCR network was expanded to three railway lines and a light railway system, with 32 railway stations and 68 light rail stations.

At first trains on the British Section ran northwards from a temporary terminus at Kowloon Point through the eastern New Territories up to the border with China at Lo Wu. The permanent southern terminus, Kowloon station in Tsim Sha Tsui, opened slightly later in 1914.

A narrow gauge railway operating works trains was used in the construction of the standard gauge British Section.  The narrow gauge materials were later used to build the now-defunct Sha Tau Kok Railway.

Communist era 
After the Chinese civil war and the victory of the Communists in mainland China in 1949, through-trains were no longer able to cross the border.

On 4 April 1979, the through train service between Canton (Guangzhou) and Kowloon (Hung Hom) resumed after agreement between Hong Kong and Chinese authorities. In January 1993, the service was extended to Foshan, and to Zhaoqing on 28 March 1995. Starting from 8 October 1995, some trains stopped at Changping station in Dongguan. In 1996, the northern terminus was relocated from Guangzhou railway station to Guangzhou East station.

Train service to Zhaoqing ended on 16 April 2017 due to renovation. Service to Foshan also stopped from 10 July 2019 following the opening of Guangzhou–Shenzhen–Hong Kong Express Rail Link. Both border crossings closed on 15 December 2021, ruling out any return of the through train service to the two cities.

Through train service was completely shut down on 28 January 2020 due to the outbreak of COVID-19 in Hong Kong. Sources in April 2022 said the train service will not resume as Express Rail Link service will reach the Guangzhou East station, therefore ending the century-long history of the through train service.

Stations

Historic stations 

The following shows the stations served by the through train in 1911 upon the commencement of service. Most of them became stops of Guangzhou–Shenzhen railway. The through train service was suspended on 14 October 1949 after communists occupied Canton.

During this period, the through train service included new stops, such as in Tin Ho (天河), Wan Luk (雲麓), Sheung Shui (上水).

Modern service

See also
 Guangzhou–Shenzhen–Hong Kong Express Rail Link

References

External links

 MTRC intercity passenger services

Rail transport in Guangdong
Passenger rail transport in Hong Kong
MTR
Z